Seán Finn (born 24 January 1996) is an Irish hurler who plays as a right corner-back for club side Bruff and at inter-county level with the Limerick senior hurling team.

Early life

Finn was born in Bruff, County Limerick. His father, Brian Finn, won a Munster Championship medal with the Limerick senior hurling team in 1994.

University career

During his studies at the University of Limerick, Finn was selected for the college's senior hurling team. On 24 February 2018, he won a Fitzgibbon Cup medal following UL's 2-21 to 2-15 defeat of Dublin City University in the final.

Club career

Finn joined the Bruff club at a young age and played in all grades at juvenile and underage levels before joining the club's top adult team. On 25 October 2014, he won a Premier Intermediate Championship medal following a 2-14 to 0-16 defeat of Croom in the final.

Inter-county career

Minor and under-21

Finn first played for the Limerick minor hurling team at the age of seventeen. On 23 July 2013, he was at left corner-back when Limerick won their first Munster Championship title in 29 years after a 1-20 to 4-08 defeat of Waterford in a replay of the final.

Finn was eligible for the minor grade again the following year. He won a second successive Munster Championship medal after a 0-24 to 0-18 second consecutive defeat of Waterford in a replay of the final. On 7 September 2014, Finn was at right corner-back for Limerick's 2-17 to 0-19 defeat by Kilkenny in the All-Ireland final.

Finn subsequently joined the Limerick under-21 hurling team and won a Munster Championship medal in his first season after a 0-22 to 0-19 win over Clare in the final. On 12 September 2015, Finn was at right corner-back when Limerick defeated Wexford by 0-26 to 1-07 in the All-Ireland final.

On 4 February 2016, Finn was ruled out for the year after tearing his cruciate ligament.

After returning to the panel in 2017, Finn won a second Munster Championship medal after a 0-16 to 1-11 defeat of Cork in the final. On 9 September 2017, Lynch was at right corner-back in Limerick's 0-17 to 0-11 defeat of Kilkenny in the All-Ireland final. He was later named on the Bord Gáis Energy Team of the Year.

Senior

2016 season

Finn was drafted onto the Limerick senior team by team manager T. J Ryan in advance of the 2016 Munster League. He made his first appearance for the team on 3 January 2016 when he lined out at right corner-back in a 2-23 to 0-18 first-round defeat of Kerry. On 23 January 2016, Finn was again included on the starting fifteen when Limerick were beaten by Clare in the final.  On 9 February 2016, it was revealed that he would miss the rest of the season after tearing his cruciate ligament.

2017 season

Finn recovered from his cruciate injury and once again earned inclusion on the Limerick team under new manager John Kiely for the 2017 season. Having played no part in the pre-season Munster League, he made his competitive debut on 4 March 2017 in a 1-25 to 3-15 National League defeat of Offaly. It was the first of his three league appearances that season, including one as a substitute in the ten-point defeat by Galway in the semi-final. On 4 June 2017, Finn made his Munster Championship debut in a 3-17 to 2-16 semi-final defeat by Clare.

2018 season

Finn was again named on the 38-man Limerick panel for the upcoming 2018 season, however, he made just one appearance during the pre-season Munster League-winning campaign. The subsequent National League saw Finn line out in five of Limerick's seven games. On 19 August 2018, he was named at right corner-back when Limerick faced Galway in the All-Ireland final. He ended the game with a winners' medal as Limerick won their first All-Ireland Championship title in 45 years after a 3-16 to 2-18 victory. Later that day he was named on the Sunday Game Team of the Year. Finn ended the season by being named in the right corner-back position on the All-Star Team.

2019 season

Finn was again a regular for Limerick during the 2019 National League, lining out in seven of their eight games. On 31 March 2019, he was selected at full-back when Limerick claimed their first Division 1 title since 1997 after a 1-24 to 0-19 win over Waterford in the final. Finn ended the 2019 Munster Championship with his first provincial winners' medal after the 2-26 to 2-14 win over Tipperary in the Munster final. He ended the season by being named in the right corner-back position on the GAA/GPA All-Star Team for the second successive year.

2020 season

Finn wasn't included on the Limerick team for the two group stage games of the 2020 Munster League. He was back on the team as a substitute for the final against Cork on 11 January 2020, coming on as a substitute in the 1-32 to 0-20 win. The subsequent National League campaign saw Finn lining out in four of Limerick's five Division 1A games. On 25 October 2020, he was at right corner-back for the 0-36 to 1-23 defeat of Clare in the delayed league final. Finn ended the 2020 Munster Championship with a second successive winners' medal after the Munster final defeat of Waterford. He was again selected at right corner-back for the All-Ireland final against Waterford on 13 December 2020, ending the game with a second title in three years after the 0-30 to 0-19 win.

Career statistics

Honours

University of Limerick
Fitzgibbon Cup (1): 2018

Bruff
Limerick Premier Intermediate Hurling Championship (1): 2014

Limerick
All-Ireland Senior Hurling Championship (4): 2018, 2020, 2021, 2022
Munster Senior Hurling Championship (3): 2019, 2020, 2021
National Hurling League (2): 2019, 2020
Munster Senior Hurling League (2): 2018, 2020
All-Ireland Under-21 Hurling Championship (2): 2015, 2017
Munster Under-21 Hurling Championship (2): 2015, 2017
Munster Minor Hurling Championship (2): 2013, 2014

Awards
All-Star Award (4): 2018, 2019, 2020, 2021
The Sunday Game Team of the Year (5): 2018, 2019, 2020, 2021, 2022

References

1996 births
Living people
Bruff hurlers
Limerick inter-county hurlers
All Stars Awards winners (hurling)